North Charlotte Street Historic District is a historic tobacco warehouse complex and national historic district located at Lancaster, Lancaster County, Pennsylvania. It includes 10 contributing buildings, built between about 1876 and about 1920. Six of the buildings were built about 1876 by John DeHaven.  The remaining buildings are the C.G. Schubert Tobacco Warehouse (c. 1880, c. 1920); Henry Martin Brick Machine Company (two buildings, 1893 and c. 1897); and the General Cigar Company (c. 1917).  All 10 buildings are brick buildings, 2 to  stories tall, and 8 of the 10 were used for the processing and storage of cigar leaf tobacco.  Some exhibit Colonial Revival style details.

It was listed on the National Register of Historic Places in 1989.

References

Industrial buildings and structures on the National Register of Historic Places in Pennsylvania
Colonial Revival architecture in Pennsylvania
Historic districts on the National Register of Historic Places in Pennsylvania
Buildings and structures in Lancaster, Pennsylvania
Historic districts in Lancaster County, Pennsylvania
Tobacco buildings in the United States
National Register of Historic Places in Lancaster, Pennsylvania